Helliconia Winter is a novel by Brian W. Aldiss published in 1985.

Plot summary

The third part of the trilogy, Helliconia Winter is set during late autumn in the northern continent, Sibornal. The book's protagonist, Luterin Shokerandit, is the son of the Keeper of the Wheel of Kharnabar, located above the far north of Helliconia. The Wheel is an extraordinary revolving monastery/prison built into a ring-shaped tunnel with a single entrance and exit, powered entirely by the efforts of the prisoners pulling it along by means of chains set into the outer wall. Once a prisoner enters a cell of the Wheel, it is impossible for him to leave until its full ten-year rotation has passed.

Luterin joins the army, where he gains renown by killing the commandant of an enemy battalion, taking his widow Toress Lahl as a slave. Soon, however, the first cases of Fat Death begin to appear in the Sibornalese army. The Oligarch, autocratic ruler of Sibornal, orders other troops to destroy this army in an attempt to halt the spread of the epidemic. Luterin is warned by Captain Fashnalgid in time for the two of them to escape with Toress Lahl and a foreign trader who has arranged for a ship to flee the area. While the ship is at sea, the Fat Death spreads among those aboard; however, thanks to the skills of Toress Lahl, who was trained as a doctor, the major characters survive. It is during this voyage that a great deal of information is discovered about the deep past of the Helliconia-Batalix solar system, its capture by Freyr, and the intertwined fates of humans and phagors.

After the ship lands, the Oligarch's army continues to pursue the deserters. They go on the run again, hiring a dog-sledge with a semi-human driver and his phagor slave in order to cross the mountains. Fashnalgid mortally offends their driver by sleeping with his wife, and the driver retaliates by arranging for his phagor to push Fashnalgid off the sledge while they are travelling through a dangerous tunnel. Luterin tries to save Fashnalgid, but also falls from the sledge. He is forced to walk for miles through the polar cold until he eventually rejoins the sledge and is able to travel the rest of the way to his father's estate.

Once home, Luterin proclaims that he wishes to marry Toress Lahl rather than his arranged noble bride, and gives Toress the key to an ancient shrine. A few days later, he expresses hatred for the Oligarch who ordered his army to be destroyed. From his father's reactions, he realises that his father is in fact the Oligarch. Luterin kills his father and flees to the Wheel of Kharnabar; he enters the Wheel and therefore remains in solitary confinement for ten years. When he at last emerges, he finds that the assassination of the former Oligarch is now seen as a positive event.

A party is arranged to celebrate Luterin's freedom and also to observe the day of Myrkwyr, when Freyr is seen for the last time, marking the beginning of the centuries-long great winter. After the festivities, the Master of Kharnabar has Luterin seized, with the intent of throwing him back into the Wheel. For phagors, Myrkwyr indicates the return of conditions favourable to their kind, and a phagor tribe makes plans to regain their dominance over humans. The phagors attack the party; Luterin escapes in the confusion and is reunited with Toress Lahl. The book ends as they leave for the shrine, where she has been living in hiding with their now ten-year-old son.

Reception
Dave Langford reviewed Helliconia Winter for White Dwarf #67, and stated that "In Winter, scenes on Earth and the orbiting Avernus Station (sketchy and less successful than the main narrative) offer two escape routes from cyclic history: enlightenment and extinction. All this and a gripping story too, of battle, murder and plague."

Neil Gaiman reviewed Helliconia Winter for Imagine magazine, and stated that "Rich and romantic, the story of the world of Helliconia where the seasons take two thousand years to turn, and humans and the horned and shaggy phagor are locked in continual struggle, is one that continues to echo through the mind long after the last page of the book is finished."

Reviews
Review by Faren Miller (1985) in Locus, #290 March 1985
Review by Michael R. Collings (1985) in Fantasy Review, April 1985
Review by Joseph Nicholas (1985) in Vector 127
Review by Tom Easton (1985) in Analog Science Fiction/Science Fact, Mid-December 1985
Review by Peter Caracciolo (1985) in Foundation, #35 Winter 1985/1986, (1986)
Review by Thomas D. Clareson (1986) in Extrapolation, Spring 1986

References

1985 novels